A gingersnap, ginger snap, ginger nut, or ginger biscuit is a biscuit flavored with ginger. Ginger snaps are flavored with powdered ginger and a variety of other spices, most commonly cinnamon, molasses and clove. There are many recipes. The brittle ginger nut style is a commercial version of the traditional fairings once made for market fairs now represented only by the Cornish fairing.

Global terminology
Ginger nuts are not to be confused with pepper nuts, which are a variety of gingerbread, somewhat smaller in diameter, but thicker. In 2009, McVitie's Ginger Nuts were listed as the tenth most popular biscuit in the UK to dunk into tea.

Ginger nuts are the most sold biscuit in New Zealand, normally attributed to its tough texture which can withstand dunking into liquid. Leading biscuit manufacturer Griffin's estimates 60 million of them are produced each year. This has become the title of a book, 60 Million Gingernuts, a chronicle of New Zealand records. In Australia, Arnott's Biscuits manufactures four different regional varieties of ginger nut to suit the tastes of people in different states.

In Canada and the United States, the cookies are usually referred to as ginger snaps.

Cloves, cinnamon and cardamom are important ingredients of these, and the actual ginger taste is not prominent. Allspice and cloves have been used to season ginger biscuits.

See also

 Annas Pepparkakor
 Brandy snaps
 Cornish fairing
 Dunking (biscuit)
 Gingerbread
 Speculaas

References

External links
 

Biscuits
Cookies
Ginger dishes

ja:ジンジャークッキー